State Route 146 (SR 146) is a  state highway that runs west-to-east through portions of Catoosa county in the northwestern part of the U.S. state of Georgia.

Route description
The route begins at an intersection with U.S. Route 27 (US 27) and SR 1 in Fort Oglethorpe. It heads east to an interchange with Interstate 75 (I-75), northwest of Indian Springs. It curves to the northeast to meet its eastern terminus at US 41/US 76/SR 3, also northwest of Indian Springs. SR 146 is not part of the National Highway System.

Major intersections

See also

References

External links

 Georgia Roads (Routes 141 - 160)

146
Transportation in Catoosa County, Georgia